Caminhos Language Centre is a Portuguese language learning centre, situated in Ipanema in Rio de Janeiro state. It was founded in March 2009 by the Association of Friends of Casa do Caminho as a non-profit organization to financially support and assist  Casa do Caminho Abrigo Orphanage in Xerém in Rio de Janeiro, which houses about 35 children. All profits from tuition and course fees go directly to the orphanage.

References

http://riotimesonline.com/brazil-news/rio-business/volunteering-at-casa-do-caminho-orphanage
http://matadornetwork.com/change/casa-do-caminho-getting-orphans-off-the-streets
https://web.archive.org/web/20140225101155/http://www.lexiophiles.com/english/10-tips-for-learning-brazilian-portuguese-for-gringos
http://riotimesonline.com/brazil-news/rio-entertainment/happy-hour-help-with-portuguese-slang

Non-profit organisations based in Brazil